Tanquary may refer to:

People
Kathryn Tanquary
Maurice Cole Tanquary

Other
Tanquary Fiord
Tanquary Fiord Airport
Tanquary Formation